TOS may refer to:

General 
 Terms of service
 The original series of a particular media, in contrast to a spin-off

Chemistry 
 Tosyl, a chemical group
 Gy's sampling theory (abbreviation)

Entertainment 
 Star Trek: The Original Series, a science fiction TV series originally known as Star Trek
 Tree of Savior, a multiplayer online role playing game published by IMC Games in 2016

Medicine 
 Thoracic outlet syndrome, a medical condition
 Toxic oil syndrome, caused by consuming non-food grade oil

Organizations 
 The Oceanography Society
 Theosophical Order of Service, an international organization
 Temple of Set, an occult society
 Tennessee Ornithological Society 
 Trucial Oman Scouts, UK force raised in Oman in 1951
 TV Oita, a Japanese TV station

Other uses
 TOS-1, a Soviet thermobaric weapon
 Tam o' Shanter (cap)
 Atari TOS (Tramiel Operating System), computer operating system
 TOS/360, Tape Operating System/360
 Tromsø Airport, Norway, IATA code
 Type of service, a field in the header of IPv4 packets
 Terminal Operating System, controlling cargo movement
 Testament of Solomon, a pseudepigraphical composite text ascribed to King Solomon
 Thinkorswim, an electronic trading platform by TD Ameritrade used to trade financial assets
 Town of Salem, a game under the social deduction genre

See also

 Toos (disambiguation)
 Toss (disambiguation)
 TOC (disambiguation)